Bürserberg is a municipality in Austria in Vorarlberg in the Bludenz district with 549 inhabitants (as of January 1, 2020).

Population

References

Cities and towns in Bludenz District